Jonathan Craniey (born 29 August 1991) is a South African cricketer. He made his List A debut for Border in the 2018–19 CSA Provincial One-Day Challenge on 30 March 2019. He made his first-class debut on 13 February 2020, for Border in the 2019–20 CSA 3-Day Provincial Cup.

References

External links
 

1991 births
Living people
South African cricketers
Border cricketers
Place of birth missing (living people)